Bati or Baati may refer to:
Bati (Fiji), traditional Fijian warriors
 The Fiji national rugby league team
 The town of Baati, Ethiopia
Baati (woreda) 
 Bati District, a district of Takeo Province, Cambodia
 The wattle-eye, or puffback flycatcher, a small, stout passerine bird of the African tropics
 One of the Bamileke ethnic groups of Cameroon
 Baati, a type of bread popular in western India
 Luca Bati, an Italian Baroque composer and music teacher